Michelle Johnson (born September 9, 1965) is an American actress who portrayed Jennifer Lyons in the 1984 romantic comedy film Blame It on Rio, Jessica Cole in The Glimmer Man (1996), and Kim Carlisle in The Love Boat (1984-1985).

Early life and education
Johnson was born in Anchorage, Alaska, to mother Faye, a nurse, and father Don, who owned a furniture store. At age four, Johnson and her mother relocated to Phoenix, Arizona, where her mother married child psychologist Dr. Grant Johnson. Johnson attended Alhambra High School from 1979 through 1983, graduating one semester early in January 1983.

Career
At age 16, Johnson began doing fashion print work and was soon signed by the Wilhelmina agency in New York City. Director Stanley Donen spotted her in a photograph in the fashion biweekly W, and just as her modeling career was beginning, chose her to act in his feature film Blame It on Rio, instead. Since she was 17 at the time, she required permission from a judge to appear nude in the film.

Johnson appeared in a number of roles over the next 15 years. She appeared in theatrical films, television movies, and television series, including a recurring role for one season of The Love Boat. She appeared in films Gung Ho (1986), Waxwork (1988), and The Glimmer Man (1996). She also co-starred in TV movie Dallas: War of the Ewings in 1998 as Jennifer Jantzen, and in 1985 played Rhonda Cummings in an episode of Dallas.

Since 2000, Johnson has starred in only one film, Mickey (2004). Other than occasional paparazzi photos, she had since remained out of the public eye until returning to acting briefly in the digital media Christmas special Brat Holiday Spectacular (2018).

Personal life
From January 15, 1999 through July 2002, Johnson was married to Major League Baseball player Matt Williams, of the Phoenix-based Arizona Diamondbacks. They resided primarily in Scottsdale, Arizona.

Johnson sold her house in West Hollywood, California, in April 2009 for a reported sum of $4.1 million. The house was near the Sunset Strip, in a celebrity-populated neighborhood.

Filmography

Television

References

External links

American film actresses
Actresses from Anchorage, Alaska
Actresses_from_Phoenix,_Arizona
1965 births
Living people
American television actresses
Female models from Alaska
Female models from Arizona
20th-century American actresses
21st-century American actresses